Falsilunatia pisum is a species of  small deepwater sea snail, a marine gastropod mollusc in the family Naticidae, the moon snails.

References

 Powell A. W. B., New Zealand Mollusca, William Collins Publishers Ltd, Auckland, New Zealand 1979

External links
 Museum of New Zealand: Falsilunatia pisum
 Luckens, Penelope A. "Distribution, size‐frequency, and growth‐ring analyses of Tawera mawsoni (Bivalvia: Veneridae) at Macquarie Island." New Zealand journal of marine and freshwater research 24.1 (1990): 59-73.

Naticidae
Gastropods of Australia
Gastropods described in 1916